The Friedrichshafen FF.43 was a German single-seat floatplane fighter of the 1910s produced by Flugzeugbau Friedrichshafen.

Development and design
Designed for defence of the floatplane bases, the FF.43 was a biplane powered by a Mercedes D.III inline piston engine driving a tractor propeller. It was armed with two 7.92 mm (0.312 in) LMG 08/15 forward-firing machine guns. Only one aircraft was built.

Specifications

See also

References

Bibliography

Further reading

1910s German fighter aircraft
Biplanes
Single-engined tractor aircraft
Floatplanes
FF.43
Aircraft first flown in 1916